Direct evidence supports the truth of an assertion (in criminal law, an assertion of guilt or of innocence) directly, i.e., without an intervening inference. A witness relates what they directly experienced, usually by sight or hearing, but also possibly through any sense including smell, touch or pain. Circumstantial evidence, by contrast, consists of a fact or set of facts which, if proven, will support the creation of an inference that the matter asserted is true.

For example, a witness who testifies that they saw the defendant shoot a victim gives direct evidence. A witness who testifies that they saw the defendant fleeing the scene of the crime, or a forensics expert who says that ballistics proves that the defendant's gun shot the bullet that killed the victim, both give circumstantial evidence from which the defendant's guilt may be inferred.

See also
Hearsay
In flagrante delicto
Smoking gun
Digital evidence

References

Legal terminology
Evidence law